Balwen may refer to:
Balwen Welsh Mountain sheep, a variety of sheep from Wales
King Balwen Mayal, a character in The Wheel of Time fantasy series by Robert Jordan